Brooklyn, Nova Scotia may refer to:

Brooklyn, Hants County, Nova Scotia (for postal purposes it may also be referred to as Newport, Nova Scotia)
Brooklyn, Queens County, Nova Scotia
Brooklyn, Yarmouth County, Nova Scotia